Nicola Legrottaglie (born 20 October 1976) is an Italian retired footballer who played as a central defender, and most recently the manager of Delfino Pescara 1936.

In a senior career that lasted two full decades, he amassed Serie A totals of 259 matches and 22 goals over 12 seasons, representing in the competition Chievo, Juventus, Bologna, Siena, Milan and Catania. He won the 2011 national championship with the fifth club.

Legrottaglie earned 16 caps for Italy, appearing for the nation at the 2009 Confederations Cup.

Club career

Early years and Chievo
Born in Gioia del Colle, Province of Bari, Legrottaglie began his career with A.S. Bari, having loan spells at A.C. Pistoiese and A.C. Prato. Following his return in June 1998 he was sold to A.C. ChievoVerona of the Serie B, appearing rarely in his second season with the team and, in January 2000, moved on loan to A.C. Reggiana 1919 in the third division; with his new club he also found playing opportunities hard to come by and, after his return to Verona, moved to the same level and also on loan, now with Modena FC.

Legrottaglie was ever-present in the starting XI during his spell at Modena, subsequently returning to Chievo for their first-ever season in Serie A. He only appeared in 15 games as the team qualified for the UEFA Cup; in his second season, the defender established himself as a top division player, scoring four goals in 32 league appearances to help to another comfortable mid-table finish (seventh).

Juventus
In the 2003 off-season, Legrottaglie was rewarded with a move to Juventus FC. The club paid €7.55million for his services to Chievo, €0.45 million being used in selling 50% of the rights to Giuseppe Sculli, Matteo Paro and Daniele Gastaldello.

Legrottaglie was a full member of the first-team squad in the 2003–04 season, taking part in 21 games and netting twice under coach Marcello Lippi. However, his poor performances during his debut season saw him win the 2004 Bidone d'Oro Award, which is given to the worst Serie A player in a particular season. Following the appointment of new manager Fabio Capello he fell down the defensive pecking order, making just two appearances in five months; he thus moved on loan to Bologna F.C. 1909 in the 2005 January transfer window, playing 11 matches – including twice in the promotion playoffs – for the Emilia-Romagna side.

Legrottaglie returned to Juventus in the summer of 2005, but was instantly loaned out to A.C. Siena for the 2005–06 campaign, alongside teammate Igor Tudor and some youth players. While at the latter he was again a regular, as his team finally avoided relegation.

Back at Juve, and as an experienced player, Legrottaglie was expected to play a role in the club's attempt to return to the top level following the 2006 Calciopoli scandal. However, he would only take the field in ten fixtures out of 42 – also being shown a red card – in a promotion as champions.

Subsequently, Legrottaglie came very close to complete a transfer to Beşiktaş J.K. on a three-year contract, worth £1.1 million per season. The Turkish were set to pay £1.6 million to acquire his services, but negotiations broke down at the last minute and hence, the player remained in Torino; under Claudio Ranieri he started the new season right where he left off, on the substitutes' bench, being fourth-choice behind Jorge Andrade, Jean-Alain Boumsong and Domenico Criscito.

Just four matches into the season, however, a serious knee injury sidelined Andrade for several months, and Legrottaglie was promoted to the starting eleven for the game against Reggina Calcio on 26 September, scoring the opener in a 4–0 rout. Criscito was loaned out to Genoa C.F.C. in January 2008 and, from then onwards, he paired with Giorgio Chiellini in central defence as the side allowed just nine goals in the first 14 matches following Andrade's injury (37 overall), finishing in third place; his contract ran originally until 30 June 2008, but in October 2007, due to his excellent form, he was awarded a two-year extension.

In 2008–09, Legrottaglie continued to be first-choice despite the arrival of Olof Mellberg from Aston Villa (Andrade also was expected to return to first-team action, but he suffered a second serious knee injury). In September 2008, one month shy of his 32nd birthday, he signed another deal until June 2011, and played 27 league matches in a runner-up finish, thus qualifying for the UEFA Champions League for the second consecutive year; veteran Fabio Cannavaro returned to the club following his spell with Real Madrid, and this relegated him to the bench for parts of the 2009–10 campaign – he ended with 19 league appearances, netting once.

Legrottaglie was injured during training in late May 2010, and thus missed out on the United States tour.

Milan
On 31 January 2011, after Juventus signed central defender Andrea Barzagli, the 34-year-old Legrottaglie – who made just eight appearances in all competitions comprised during the first half of the season, under new manager Luigi Delneri – left on a free transfer for fellow league side A.C. Milan, signing a six-month deal. However, he was only able to make one league appearance for the eventual champions due to a serious head injury suffered during a 0–0 draw with S.S. Lazio.

Legrottaglie was released on 30 June, following the expiration of his contract.

Catania
On 24 August 2011, Legrottaglie joined Calcio Catania on a two-year contract. He scored on his official debut, a 3–3 away draw against Novara Calcio.

Legrottaglie revived his career overall under Vincenzo Montella. He finished 2011–12 with 35 official games and six goals, helping the Sicilians to a fourth successive season in which they broke their record points total in Serie A, finishing 11th.

International career
Legrottaglie made his debut for Italy on 20 November 2002, in a friendly match with Turkey in Pescara, and went on to appear in a further six matches in a one-year span, mostly friendlies. He scored his only goal in April 2003, in a 2–1 victory over Switzerland.

Following solid performances at Juventus, Legrottaglie received his first cap in four years, appearing in a friendly against Austria while filling in for injured teammate Chiellini in an 18 August 2008 contest held in Nice. His former Juventus coach Lippi was in charge of the national team.

On 2 May 2010, 33-year-old Legrottaglie was included in a 29-man provisional list for the 2010 FIFA World Cup, attending the training camp in Rome, but was subsequently dropped from the 30-player list submitted to FIFA on the 11th, with Villarreal CF's Giuseppe Rossi and A.S. Roma's Daniele De Rossi taking his place. His only major international tournament was the 2009 FIFA Confederations Cup in South Africa, with Italy exiting in the group stage.

Coaching career
Legrottaglie retired at the end of the 2013–14 campaign as Catania suffered top-flight relegation, aged nearly 38. He then returned to Bari after 18 years, being appointed under-17 team manager.

Legrottaglie took his first role as a head coach in July 2015, accepting an offer from Sicilian Lega Pro club S.S. Akragas Città dei Templi. He resigned the following January due to poor results and, on 9 January 2017, was named new assistant to Massimo Rastelli at Cagliari Calcio in the Italian top division; in October, as the latter was dismissed, he too left.

On 24 June 2019, Legrottaglie was announced as the new under-19 manager of Delfino Pescara 1936, replacing Luciano Zauri after the latter's promotion as first-team manager. On 21 January 2020, he was promoted to head coach after Zauri's resignation from his post.

Style of play
Legrottaglie was praised by pundits for his physical attributes and his ability in the air, making him a goal threat from set pieces. A strong yet elegant player, he excelled in sliding challenges and at organising high defensive lines, also being gifted with good technical ability, passing range and vision, which allowed him to advance into the midfield. He was also tactically versatile, excelling at reading the game and possessing a powerful shot from distance.

Despite his reputation, Legrottaglie was also criticised at times for inconsistency and lapses in man-marking.

Personal life
Legrottaglie attracted controversy when he condemned homosexuality in his 2009 autobiography, calling it a "sin" according to his Christian beliefs. He is a member of the Italian Evangelical Alliance (an offspring of the World Evangelical Alliance), a Protestant charismatic denomination, and of the Athletes of Christ. Also for reasons of faith, he did not have sexual intercourses with his wife Erika for the five years before their marriage.

Career statistics
Score and result list Italy's goal tally first, score column indicates score after Legrottaglie goal.

Managerial statistics
As of 6 July 2020

Honours
Juventus
Supercoppa Italiana: 2003
Serie B: 2006–07
Coppa Italia runner-up: 2003–04

Milan
Serie A: 2010–11

References

External links
Juventus official profile 

National team data  

1976 births
Living people
Sportspeople from the Province of Taranto
Italian evangelicals
Italian footballers
Association football defenders
Serie A players
Serie B players
Serie C players
S.S.C. Bari players
U.S. Pistoiese 1921 players
A.C. Prato players
A.C. ChievoVerona players
A.C. Reggiana 1919 players
Modena F.C. players
Juventus F.C. players
Bologna F.C. 1909 players
A.C.N. Siena 1904 players
A.C. Milan players
Catania S.S.D. players
Italy international footballers
2009 FIFA Confederations Cup players
Italian football managers
Serie B managers
Delfino Pescara 1936 managers
Footballers from Apulia